The 2016–17 season was CSKA Sofia's 68th season in the Bulgarian A Football Group after their administrative relegation in the third division during the past season due to mounting financial troubles. This article shows player statistics and all matches (official and friendly) that the club will play during the 2016–17 season.

Players

Squad stats 

|-
|colspan="14"|Players sold or loaned out after the start of the season:

|}

Players in/out

Summer transfers 

In:

Out:

Winter transfers 

In:

Out:

Pre-season and friendlies

Competitions

Parva Liga

Regular season

League table

Results summary

Results by round

Results

Championship round

League table

Results summary

Results by round

Results

Bulgarian Cup

See also 
PFC CSKA Sofia

References

External links 
CSKA Official Site
CSKA Fan Page with up-to-date information
Bulgarian A Professional Football Group
UEFA Profile

PFC CSKA Sofia seasons
Cska Sofia